is the ninth studio album by Japanese artist Masaharu Fukuyama. It was released on 6 December 2006. This album was released five years after his previous album, f, making it the longest interval between releases for the artist.

Track listing

CD
Freedom

 (new mix)
 (new mix)
 (new mix)
 (new mix)
Red x Blue (new mix)

Milk Tea
 (new mix)
Love Train
 (new mix)
Beautiful Day

Bonus CD (Limited Edition)
Sandy

Charts and sales

Oricon sales charts (Japan)

References

2006 albums
Masaharu Fukuyama albums